Ribeira dos Calhaus is a settlement in the western part of the island of São Nicolau, Cape Verde. It is part of the municipality of Tarrafal de São Nicolau. It is situated in a valley northwest of Monte Gordo, 3 km southeast of Praia Branca and 7 km north of Tarrafal de São Nicolau.

See also
List of villages and settlements in Cape Verde

References

Villages and settlements in São Nicolau, Cape Verde
Tarrafal de São Nicolau